Michele Massimo Tarantini (born 7 August 1942) is an Italian film director.

Life and career 
Born in Corato, Bari, at young age Tarantini was assumed by the production company Dania Cinematografica, for which he held various positions including secretary of production, set designer, film editor and assistant director for Sergio Martino, Giuliano Carnimeo, Nando Cicero and Mariano Laurenti.

Tarantini made his directorial debut in 1973 with a giallo-crime film, Seven Hours of Violence, but his first commercial success was the 1975 sexy comedy La liceale, which launched the career of Gloria Guida. Since then, Tarantini became one of the prominent and most successful directors in the commedia sexy all'italiana film genre.

In 1983 Tarantini moved to Brazil, where he kept directing low-budget genre films, often under the stage name Michael E. Lemick. His last film is the 2001 comedy Se lo fai sono guai.

Selected filmography 
 Seven Hours of Violence (1973)
 Teasers (1975)
 La professoressa di scienze naturali (1976)
 Confessions of a Lady Cop (1976)
 Crimebusters (1976)
 Taxi Girl (1977)
 A Man Called Magnum (1977)
 The School Teacher in the House (1978)
 La dottoressa ci sta col colonnello (1980)
 L'insegnante al mare con tutta la classe (1980)
 La moglie in bianco... l'amante al pepe (1980)
 La dottoressa preferisce i marinai (1981)
 L'assistente sociale tutto pepe (1981)
 A Policewoman in New York (1981)
 Giovani, belle... probabilmente ricche (1982)
 The Sword of the Barbarians (1983)
 Massacre in Dinosaur Valley (1985)

References

External links 
 

1942 births
Italian film directors
People from the Province of Bari
Italian film editors
Living people
Giallo film directors